William Hollister House is a historic home located at New Bern, Craven County, North Carolina.  It was built in 1840–1841, and is a -story, three bay, side-hall plan, Federal style frame dwelling.  It has a gable roof and a single-story, one-room wing.

It was listed on the National Register of Historic Places in 1972.

References

Houses on the National Register of Historic Places in North Carolina
Federal architecture in North Carolina
Houses completed in 1841
Houses in New Bern, North Carolina
National Register of Historic Places in Craven County, North Carolina
1841 establishments in North Carolina